Sir Robert Salusbury, 1st Baronet (10 September 1756 – 17 November 1817) was a British Member of Parliament.

He was the eldest son of Robert Salusbury of Cotton Hall, Denbighshire and educated at Trinity College, Cambridge (1775) before studying law from 1776 at Lincoln's Inn, where he was called to the bar in 1785.

He was a Member of Parliament (MP) for Monmouthshire from 1792 to 1796 and for Brecon from 1796 to 1812. He was made a baronet on 4 May 1795 and was High Sheriff of Monmouthshire for 1786–87.

In 1780 he married Catherine, daughter and eventual heiress of Charles Van of Llanwern. They had three sons and two daughters. In 1816 he was jailed in the King's Bench Prison for bankruptcy and died at Canterbury in 1817.

References 

1756 births
1817 deaths
Alumni of Trinity Hall, Cambridge
Members of Lincoln's Inn
Baronets in the Baronetage of Great Britain
Members of the Parliament of Great Britain for Welsh constituencies
British MPs 1790–1796
British MPs 1796–1800
Members of the Parliament of the United Kingdom for Welsh constituencies
UK MPs 1801–1802
UK MPs 1802–1806
UK MPs 1806–1807
UK MPs 1807–1812
Robert
High Sheriffs of Monmouthshire